The East Holliston Historic District encompasses an area of early colonial settlement and later development in Holliston, Massachusetts.  The linear district extends along Washington Street (Massachusetts Route 16) between Old Locust Street and the northeast junction with Curve Street, and then the full length of Curve Street.  The area includes some of Holliston's early settlements, including the site of its first meeting house, near Curve Street and Jarr Brook.  In the late 18th and early 19th centuries Jarr Brook became a point of industrial development, leading to the construction of a number of Greek Revival houses.  Significant construction ended in the district around 1870.

The district was listed on the National Register of Historic Places in 2002.

See also
National Register of Historic Places listings in Middlesex County, Massachusetts

References

Buildings and structures in Holliston, Massachusetts
Historic districts in Middlesex County, Massachusetts
National Register of Historic Places in Middlesex County, Massachusetts
Historic districts on the National Register of Historic Places in Massachusetts